Çamkalabak is a village in the Ayvacık District of Çanakkale Province in Turkey. Its population was 651 in 2021.

References

Villages in Ayvacık District, Çanakkale